Krown Power is the thirteenth studio album by American hip hop group Kottonmouth Kings. The standard version of the album contains 18 tracks, and the deluxe edition contains 37 tracks.

Background
Since early/mid 2014, Kottonmouth Kings have been talking about their new album, and posting pictures on their social media accounts of them working on the album.

Promotion
In early/mid 2014 KMK posted their first photo of the group together taking promo shots for the new album Krown Power. Since then they have continued to do so on all their social media accounts. They plan to go on tour to promote the album during the summer of 2015. On March 30, 2015 Daddy X posted a picture on his Facebook account saying that the album will now be released in June 2015, and will release a music video/single every month leading up to the release of the album. On April 20, 2015 the first music video was released titled, Ganja Glow. In late April/early May a short 18 second clip of the new music video titled Our City was released. It was announced in late May/early June that you could pre order the 18 song album. And in one of the packages you could pre order the album in included a bonus disc with 19 extra songs. On July 17, 2015 the album was made available for preorder, and the track list was revealed. On July 31, 2015 the second music video was released. KMK is working on music videos for the songs "Our City", "Pump Up Da Bass", "Ganja Glow", "Audio War" and "Permastoned".

Music videos/singles
The first single was released on April 20, 2015, titled "Ganja Glow" and featuring United Family Music artist Marlon Asher. The end of the song featured a snippet of the song "Our City".

In May 2015 KMK posted pictures of the group shooting the video for the song "Our City". The second single was "Our City" and released the music video on July 31, 2015 also launching United Family Music's official web page.

In June 2015 KMK posted pictures of the group shooting the video for the song "Audio War". A few days into shooting the video KMK member Daddy X, and a crew member were injured during the shoot and delayed shooting for a few days.

A few weeks later KMK posted pictures of the group shooting a video for the song "Pump Up Da Bass". On August 5, 2015 KMK released the third single titled "Pump Up Da Bass" featuring Marlon Asher and was accompanied by a music video.

In late July KMK posted pictures of the group shooting a video for the song "Permastoned".

In early August KMK posted pictures of the group shooting a video for the song "Sink Or Swim".

On August 14, 2015 KMK released the new single titled "Kronitron".

Track listing

Personnel
Daddy X – lyrics, vocals, production
D-Loc – lyrics, vocals, production
The Dirtball – lyrics, vocals, production
Lou Dogg – drums, percussion
Marlon Asher – vocals, lyrics ("Pump Up Da Bass", "Don't Feel Down" & "Ganja Glow")
Jared Gomes – vocals, lyrics ("Keep It Movin'")
C4MULA – vocals, lyrics ("Tbh", "Eternal Speed", "Fuck Whatcha Heard", "Walk The Line", "Same Way", "Coming For You" & "Intoxifaded")
Nicky Gritts - vocals, lyrics ("Same Way")
Insane Clown Posse – vocals, lyrics ("Fuck Off")

Deluxe edition
Daddy X – lyrics, vocals, production
D-Loc – lyrics, vocals, production
The Dirtball – lyrics, vocals, production
Lou Dogg – drums, percussion
C4Mula – lyrics, vocals ("Eternal Speed", "Walk The Line")
Saint Dog – lyrics, vocals ("Fuck Whatcha Heard")
Twiztid – lyrics, vocals ("1 More Body)
Blaze Ya Dead Homie – ("1 More Body")
Hed pe ("1 More Body")
Allensworth – vocals, lyrics ("Digital Flow")
Pilot Touhill – vocals, lyrics ("Let's Light Up")

Songs by other artists
Upso12 – ("Summer Lovin'" ft. D-Loc & Judge D)
The Dirtball – ("Microphone Murdura")
Chucky Chuck ("Laughing" ft. Daddy X)
D-Loc – ("Smoked Out" ft. Judge D)
Pilot Touhill – ("6:00 am")
C4MULA & Nicky Gritts – ("Same Way" ft. Daddy X)
Allensworth & C4mula – ("Coming For You")
C4mula – ("Intoxifaded" ft. Chucky Chuck)
DJ Dogboy – ("Passion Hustling")

Charts

References

2015 albums
Hardcore hip hop albums
Kottonmouth Kings albums